Devils Lake Public School District 1, also known as Devils Lake Public Schools, is a school district serving Devils Lake, North Dakota.

In Ramsey County the district serves Devils Lake and Crary. It also includes a section of Benson County.

Schools
 Devils Lake High School
 Lake Area Career & Technology Center
 Central Middle School
 Minnie H Elementary
 Prairie View Elementary
 Sweetwater Elementary

References

External links
 

School districts in North Dakota
Education in Ramsey County, North Dakota
Education in Benson County, North Dakota